Yasothon may refer to
Yasothon town in Thailand
Yasothon province
Mueang Yasothon district
For Yasothon soils, see the geology of Khorat plateau